Phiaton Corporation, a division of Korean company Cresyn Co., Ltd., is based in Fountain Valley, CA, specializing in the design and production of audio equipment, including headphones, earphones and headsets.

History
Phiaton is a division of Cresyn, a large South Korean electronics company that was founded in 1959. Cresyn started manufacturing OEM headphones in the 1980s; nowadays it produces roughly 15 million headphones a month, operates 6 manufacturing plants and employs 15 thousand people at its factories in Indonesia, China, and Vietnam. Cresyn launched Phiaton in the United States in 2008 as an initiative to launch a privately branded high-end headphone line.

References

External links
Phiaton Website
BBB.Org
Audioholics

Corporate subsidiaries
Companies based in Irvine, California
Headphones manufacturers
Audio equipment manufacturers of South Korea
South Korean brands